The 2012 Superclásico de las Américas – Copa Doctor Nicolás Leoz was the second edition of the Superclásico de las Américas. Brazil won 4–3 on penalties after a 3–3 draw on aggregate and conquered their second title.

The first leg was played at Estádio Serra Dourada, Goiânia, which Brazil won, 2–1. The second leg was originally scheduled to be played on October 3, 2012, at the Estadio Centenario in Resistencia, Chaco, but was postponed due to a power failure in the stadium. Both the CBF and AFA agreed on a new date for the match, and it was decided to be held on November 21, 2012 at La Bombonera, Buenos Aires.

Venues

Matches

First leg

|valign="top"|
|style="vertical-align:top; width:50%;"|

|}

Second leg

|valign="top"|
|style="vertical-align:top; width:50%;"|

|}

References

2012
2012
2012
2012 in Brazilian football
2012–13 in Argentine football
2012
Association football penalty shoot-outs
September 2012 sports events in South America
November 2012 sports events in South America